Patryk Sieradzki (born 6 October 1998) is a Polish middle-distance runner specialising in the 800 metres.

References

1998 births
Living people
Polish male middle-distance runners
20th-century Polish people
21st-century Polish people